The Creu de Sant Jordi (in English 'St George's Cross') is one of the highest civil distinctions awarded in Catalonia (Spain), surpassed only in protocol by the Gold Medal of the Generalitat de Catalunya. It was established by the Generalitat de Catalunya autonomous government by virtue of the Decret 457/1981 de 18 de desembre in 1981. The medal was designed by goldsmith Joaquim Capdevila.

Recipients
List of awardees
List of awardees in the Balearic Islands

References 

1981 establishments in Spain
Catalan awards
Orders, decorations, and medals of Spain
Orders, decorations, and medals of country subdivisions
Awards established in 1981